SnoBar Cocktails is a line of alcohol-infused ice cream and ice-pops that launched in Arizona on December 9, 2011. In January 2012, the company announced plans to be available at pools in Las Vegas by the summer.

Alcohol content 
With a pure alcohol content range of 3.59 to 6.41 percent (8.22 to 14.67 alc/vol), each serving of SnoBar ice-pops and ice cream has the equivalent alcohol percentage of a full cocktail. The amount of alcohol in the drink varies by the drink ordered.

References

Cocktails
Ice cream brands